Bridgeport is an unincorporated community in Bridgeport Charter Township, Saginaw County in the U.S. state of Michigan. It is also a census-designated place (CDP) for statistical purposes. The population was 6,571 at the 2020 census. Bridgeport is also the name of a post office with ZIP code 48722. The area served by the ZIP code includes the southeast portion of the CDP and includes southeastern portions of Bridgeport Charter Township outside of the CDP as well as portions of southwest Frankenmuth Township and a small area of northeastern Birch Run Township. The remainder of the CDP area is served by the Saginaw ZIP code 48601.

Geography

Its area is start at the City of Saginaw southeasternmost border along the north border of the Township to I-75 to King Road east to Portsmouth Rd. Portsmouth south to Baker Road then south along Airport to Dixie Highway to I-75 south to Riverview Drive to north on Fort Road then flowing the river back to Dixie. West on Dixie to Washington Rd hence to Huron & Eastern Railway north to Williamson Rd and the Saginaw City border.

Demographics

As of the census of 2000, there were 7,849 people, 3,022 households, and 2,106 families residing in the CDP. The racial makeup of the CDP was 64.05% White, 28.59% African American, 0.54% Native American, 0.24% Asian, 3.83% from other races, and 2.75% from two or more races. Hispanic or Latino of any race were 10.29% of the population.

There were 3,022 households, out of which 31.7% had children under the age of 18 living with them, 47.6% were married couples living together, 17.9% had a female householder with no husband present, and 30.3% were non-families. 26.1% of all households were made up of individuals, and 8.6% had someone living alone who was 65 years of age or older. The average household size was 2.54 and the average family size was 3.03.

In the CDP, the population was spread out, with 26.2% under the age of 18, 8.8% from 18 to 24, 25.7% from 25 to 44, 26.0% from 45 to 64, and 13.2% who were 65 years of age or older. The median age was 38 years. For every 100 females, there were 87.2 males. For every 100 females age 18 and over, there were 83.5 males.

The median income for a household in the CDP was $37,515, and the median income for a family was $45,691. Males had a median income of $36,825 versus $22,790 for females. The per capita income for the CDP was $19,797. About 9.1% of families and 11.3% of the population were below the poverty line, including 17.1% of those under age 18 and 7.4% of those age 65 or over.

Education 
Bridgeport-Spaulding Community School District operates public schools.

Notable people 

 Monty Brown, wrestler for Total Nonstop Action Wrestling; linebacker for the Buffalo Bills and New England Patriots
David R. Gilmour, diplomat
 David Haas, author and composer of contemporary Catholic liturgical music

References

External links

 Bridgeport High School
 Bridgeport Charter Township: http://www.bridgeportmi.org

Unincorporated communities in Saginaw County, Michigan
Census-designated places in Michigan
Unincorporated communities in Michigan
Census-designated places in Saginaw County, Michigan